Paul Roderick Gibbs (born 6 December 1941) is a former rugby union player who represented Australia.

Gibbs, a fly-half, was born in Birmingham and claimed one international rugby cap for Australia. He also played for Hong Kong.

References

Australian rugby union players
Australia international rugby union players
1941 births
Living people
Rugby union players from Birmingham, West Midlands
Rugby union fly-halves